Wilson County (standard abbreviation: WL) is a county located in Southeast Kansas. As of the 2020 census, the county population was 8,624. Its county seat is Fredonia.

History

Early history

For many millennia, the Great Plains of North America was inhabited by nomadic Native Americans.  From the 16th century to 18th century, the Kingdom of France claimed ownership of large parts of North America.  In 1762, after the French and Indian War, France secretly ceded New France to Spain, per the Treaty of Fontainebleau.

19th century
In 1802, Spain returned most of the land to France, but keeping title to about 7,500 square miles.  In 1803, most of the land for modern day Kansas was acquired by the United States from France as part of the 828,000 square mile Louisiana Purchase for 2.83 cents per acre.

In 1854, the Kansas Territory was organized. In 1855, Wilson County was established and included what is now Wilson County and Montgomery County. It was named for Colonel Hiero T. Wilson. He was a successful Indian trader who had been the first white settler of Fort Scott, Kansas and had served as postmaster and sutler at the fort. He could speak Cherokee, Creek, and Osage and the Osage called him "Big White Chief". He was a delegate to the Lecompton Constitutional Convention.

Geography

Adjacent counties
 Woodson County (north)
 Allen County (northeast)
 Neosho County (east)
 Montgomery County (south)
 Elk County (west)
 Greenwood County (northwest)

Demographics

As of the census of 2000, there were 10,332 people, 4,203 households, and 2,849 families residing in the county.  The population density was 18 people per square mile (7/km2).  There were 4,937 housing units at an average density of 9 per square mile (3/km2).  The racial makeup of the county was 96.78% White, 0.37% Black or African American, 0.88% Native American, 0.26% Asian, 0.04% Pacific Islander, 0.48% from other races, and 1.19% from two or more races.  1.67% of the population were Hispanic or Latino of any race.

There were 4,203 households, out of which 29.60% had children under the age of 18 living with them, 57.10% were married couples living together, 7.80% had a female householder with no husband present, and 32.20% were non-families. 29.10% of all households were made up of individuals, and 15.80% had someone living alone who was 65 years of age or older.  The average household size was 2.40 and the average family size was 2.96.

In the county, the population was spread out, with 25.40% under the age of 18, 7.40% from 18 to 24, 23.80% from 25 to 44, 23.40% from 45 to 64, and 19.90% who were 65 years of age or older.  The median age was 41 years. For every 100 females there were 94.20 males.  For every 100 females age 18 and over, there were 89.60 males.

The median income for a household in the county was $29,747, and the median income for a family was $36,990. Males had a median income of $27,255 versus $18,670 for females. The per capita income for the county was $14,910.  About 7.50% of families and 11.30% of the population were below the poverty line, including 13.40% of those under age 18 and 11.80% of those age 65 or over.

Government

Presidential elections

Wilson County is overwhelmingly Republican. No Democratic presidential candidate has carried Wilson County since Franklin D. Roosevelt in 1932, and none have passed 36 percent since Jimmy Carter in 1976.

Laws
Following amendment to the Kansas Constitution in 1986, the county remained a prohibition, or "dry", county until 1998, when voters approved the sale of alcoholic liquor by the individual drink with a 30 percent food sales requirement.

Education

Unified school districts
 Altoona-Midway USD 387
 Neodesha USD 461
 Fredonia USD 484

Communities

Cities
 Altoona
 Benedict
 Buffalo
 Coyville
 Fredonia
 Neodesha
 New Albany

Unincorporated communities
† means a Census-Designated Place (CDP) by the United States Census Bureau.
 Buxton
 Lafontaine†
 Rest
 Roper
 Vilas

Townships
Wilson County is divided into fifteen townships.  The cities of Fredonia and Neodesha are considered governmentally independent and are excluded from the census figures for the townships.  In the following table, the population center is the largest city (or cities) included in that township's population total, if it is of a significant size.

See also
 National Register of Historic Places listings in Wilson County, Kansas

Notes

References

Further reading

  
 Handbook of Wilson County, Kansas; C.S. Burch Publishing Co; 44 pages; 1886.
 Standard Atlas of Wilson County, Kansas; Geo. A. Ogle & Co; 52 pages; 1910.
 Historical Atlas of Wilson County, Kansas; John P. Edwards; 35 pages; 1881.

External links

County
 
 Wilson County - Directory of Public Officials
Maps
 Wilson County Maps: Current, Historic, KDOT
 Kansas Highway Maps: Current, Historic, KDOT
 Kansas Railroad Maps: Current, 1996, 1915, KDOT and Kansas Historical Society

 
Kansas counties
1855 establishments in Kansas Territory